Pocket Symphony is the fourth studio album by French electronic music duo Air, released on 5 March 2007 by Virgin Records. It features collaborations with Jarvis Cocker and Neil Hannon. Pocket Symphony incorporates some of the Japanese instruments Godin had recently learned to play from an Okinawan master musician: the koto (also referred to as a Japanese floor harp) and the three-string, banjo-like shamisen. However, a press release claims that "conventional instruments continue to play a great role" in the duo's music. The album features art by Xavier Veilhan.

Pocket Symphony debuted at number 40 on the US Billboard 200, with 17,000 copies sold in its first week. As of February 2012, it had sold 77,000 copies in the United States.

The term "pocket symphony" was popularised by English journalist Derek Taylor, who used it to describe the Beach Boys' 1966 single "Good Vibrations".

Track listing

Personnel
Credits adapted from the liner notes of Pocket Symphony.

Air
 Nicolas Godin – bass ; solina ; guitars ; synth bass ; drum machine ; shamisen ; piano ; koto ; synthesizers ; vocals ; glockenspiel ; tambourine ; drums ; Memorymoog ; wind chimes 
 JB Dunckel – piano ; synthesizers ; vibraphone ; vocals ; glockenspiel ; samples ; ARP percussions, xylophone ; voice pad ; drum machine ; Rhodes ; synth bass

Additional musicians
 Joey Waronker – drums, percussion 
 Magic Malik – flute 
 Tony Allen – drums 
 Jarvis Cocker – vocals 
 Neil Hannon – vocals 
 Joby Talbot – string arrangements, string conducting 
 David Richard Campbell – string arrangements

Technical
 Nigel Godrich – production, engineering
 Air – production
 Darrell Thorp – engineering
 Florian Lagatta – engineering
 Simon Hayes – engineering assistance
 Andrew Rugg – engineering assistance
 Bob Ludwig – mastering at Gateway Mastering (Portland, Maine)

Artwork
 Xavier Veilhan – artwork
 Lili Fleury – artwork
 Laurent Pinon – artwork

Charts

Weekly charts

Year-end charts

References

2007 albums
Air (French band) albums
Albums produced by Nigel Godrich
Astralwerks albums
Virgin Records albums